Walter Macken (3 May 1915 – 22 April 1967) (Irish Uaitéar Ó Maicín), was born in Galway, Ireland. He was a writer of short stories, novels and plays.

Biography
Walter Macken was originally an actor, principally with the Taibhdhearc (where he met his wife, Peggy) in Galway, and The Abbey Theatre in Dublin. He also played lead roles on Broadway in M. J. Molloy's The King of Friday's Men and his own play Home Is the Hero. The success of his third book, Rain on the Wind (winner of the Literary Guild award in the USA), enabled him to focus his energies on writing.  He also acted in films, notably in Arthur Dreifuss' adaptation of Brendan Behan's The Quare Fellow. He is perhaps best known for his trilogy of Irish historical novels Seek the Fair Land, The Silent People and The Scorching Wind.

His son Ultan Macken is a well-known journalist in the print and broadcast media of Ireland, and wrote a biography of his father, Walter Macken: Dreams on Paper.

List of works

Plays
Mungo's Mansion (Macmillan, 1946)
Vacant Possession (Macmillan, 1948) 
Home is the Hero (Macmillan, 1952)
Twilight is the Warrior (Macmillan, 1956)

Novels
Quench the Moon (Macmillan, 1948)
I Am Alone (Macmillan, 1949) 
Rain on the Wind (London, MacMillan, 1950)
The Bogman (MacMillan, 1952)
Sunset on the Window Panes (Macmillan, 1954)
Sullivan (Macmillan, 1957)
Seek the Fair Land (MacMillan, 1959)
The Silent People (MacMillan, 1962)
The Scorching Wind (MacMillan, 1964)
Brown Lord of the Mountain (Macmillan, 1966)

Two further novels, 'And then No More' (1946) and 'Cockles and Mustard' (1947) remain unpublished.

Novels for children
Macken wrote some 5 collections of short stories for children, and also:
Island of the Great Yellow Ox (MacMillan, 1966)
Flight of the Doves (MacMillan, 1963), which was adapted for the cinema.

Short Story Collections
The Green Hills (MacMillan, 1956) 

God Made Sunday and other Stories (Macmillan, 1962) 

The Coll Doll and other Stories (Macmillan, 1969) 

City of the Tribes  (Brandon, 1997) 

The Grass of the People (Brandon, 1998)

References

External links
 
 Entry at Irish Writers Online
 Website for Walter Macken

1915 births
1967 deaths
Irish male stage actors
Irish male dramatists and playwrights
People from Galway (city)
People from County Galway
20th-century Irish novelists
20th-century Irish male writers
20th-century Irish dramatists and playwrights
20th-century Irish male actors
Irish male novelists
Irish historical novelists
Writers of historical fiction set in the early modern period